Ceratostigma plumbaginoides (蓝雪花), the hardy blue-flowered leadwort, is a species of flowering plant in the plumbago family, native to Western China (Beijing Shi, Henan, Jiangsu, Shanxi, Zhejiang), where it is usually found in rocky foothills.

The leaves may turn red or purple before falling.

The Latin specific epithet plumbaginoides signifies its resemblance to plants in the closely related genus Plumbago.

Ceratostigma plumbaginoides is grown as an ornamental plant in temperate climates, valued for its late season colour. As it can become invasive, it is particularly suited to growing in a pot, or crevices in a dry stone wall. It has gained the Royal Horticultural Society’s Award of Garden Merit.

Etymology
Ceratostigma is derived from Greek, meaning 'horned stigma’. This is in reference to the ‘shape of the stigmatic surface’.

References

Flora of China
plumbaginoides
Taxa named by Alexander von Bunge